Guatteria eriopoda is a species of plant in the Annonaceae family. It is endemic to Peru.

References

eriopoda
Endemic flora of Peru
Trees of Peru
Vulnerable flora of South America
Taxonomy articles created by Polbot